Twi is a collection of dialects of the Akan language, spoken in Ghana.

TWI or Twi may also refer to:

 Twi-, a numerical prefix

As an acronym
 Tailwind Airlines (ICAO code), Turkish charter airline
 Tolerable weekly intake, an estimate of the amount of a harmful substance that can be safely ingested
 The Way International, a religious organization considered by some to be a cult
 The Welding Institute, a research and technology organisation based in the UK
 Tin Wing stop (MTR station code), a Light Rail stop in Hong Kong
 Topographic Wetness Index, an algorithm based on slope and flow accumulation
 Trade weighted index, an economic instrument used to compare exchange rates
 Training Within Industry, a service in the US that provided consultancy to war-related industries during World War II
 Trans World International, a distributor and producer of televised sports
 Tread Wear Indicator, a safety indicator on vehicle tyres (tires) shown in the Tire code
 Twickenham railway station (National Rail station code), a railway station in London
 Two-wire interface, a variant of I²C
 Two-way immersion, a form of dual language education

See also

 
 TWL (disambiguation)
 TW1 (disambiguation)